The Land of Kir is a location mentioned in the Hebrew Bible, where the Arameans are said to have originated from. It is also the place to which Tiglath-Pileser III of Assyria carried the Aramean captives after he had taken the city of Damascus and conquered the kingdom of Aram-Damascus.  mentions it together with Elam, implying an association between the two. This "Kir" is situated east of the Euprates or the Tigris River. Some scholars have supposed that Kir is a variant of Cush (Susiana), on the south of Elam. Other scholars believe that the Land of Kir is a location at Carma, an ancient city on banks of the Mardus River in modern-day Iran, or an area on the Kar River in the northern reaches of Ancient Armenia. Some Jewish scholars believe the Land of Kir to be located at Ihi Dekirah, a place east of the Euphrates River about halfway between Anah and Babylon, near Hīt in modern-day Iraq.

See also
Amos 9
Isaiah 22
Kir of Moab

References

Hebrew Bible places
Aram (region)
Ancient Syria
Elam